Boana phaeopleura is a species of frog in the family Hylidae that is endemic to Brazil. Its natural habitats are subtropical or tropical dry forests, moist savanna, subtropical or tropical moist shrubland, subtropical or tropical high-altitude shrubland, and rivers. It is threatened by habitat loss.

Sources

Boana
Endemic fauna of Brazil
Amphibians described in 2000
Taxonomy articles created by Polbot